Glipostenoda quinquestrigosa is a species of beetle in the genus Glipostenoda. It was described in 1958.

References

quinquestrigosa
Beetles described in 1958